Marquette Catholic School can refer to:
 Marquette Catholic Schools of West Point, Iowa
 Marquette Catholic School in Tulsa, Oklahoma - See List of schools in Tulsa, Oklahoma